The 2017 CONCACAF Under-17 Championship was the 5th edition of the CONCACAF Under-17 Championship (18th edition if all eras included), the men's under-17 international football tournament organized by CONCACAF. It was hosted in Panama between 21 April and 7 May 2017.

The competition was used to determine the four CONCACAF representatives at the 2017 FIFA U-17 World Cup in India.

Qualified teams

The qualifying competition for the tournament began in July 2016.

Note: no titles or runners-up between 1999 and 2007.
All previous appearances of Curaçao as the former Netherlands Antilles.
Bold indicates that the corresponding team was hosting the event.

Venues

Draw
The draw took place on December 13, 2016 at 19:00 EST (UTC−5) at Sheraton Grand Panama, Panama City, Panama, and was streamed live via CONCACAF.com.

Different from previous tournaments, the 12 teams were drawn into three groups of four teams in the group stage. Panama, Mexico and Costa Rica were seeded into each of the three groups.
Panama, as hosts, were seeded in position A1.
Costa Rica, as the best-ranked CONCACAF team in the 2015 FIFA U-17 World Cup, excluding Mexico, were seeded in position B1.
Mexico, as champions of the 2015 CONCACAF U-17 Championship, were seeded in position C1.

The remaining nine teams were allocated to pots 2–4 designed to ensure balanced and competitive groups weighted equally by region. They were drawn in order and placed in the group position drawn from Pots A, B and C.

The top two teams from each group in the group stage advance to the classification stage, where the six teams are drawn into two groups of three teams. The positions of each group winner and runner-up from the group stage were then drawn in group pairs, randomly into the two groups (D and E) for the classification stage.

The top two teams from each group in the classification stage qualify for the 2017 FIFA U-17 World Cup, with the group winners also advancing to the final to decide the champions of the CONCACAF U-17 Championship.

Referees

 Adrián Skeete
 Juan Calderón Pérez
 Michel Raynel Rodríguez Roque
 Bryan López Castellanos
 Gladwyn Johnson
 Héctor Martínez
 Daneon Parchment
 Luis Santander Aguirre
 José Kellys Marquez
 Ismael Cornejo Meléndez
 Rodphin Harris
 Armando Villarreal

Squads

Each squad could contain 20 players (including two goalkeepers).

Group stage
The top two teams from each group in the group stage advanced to the classification stage.

Tiebreakers (for both group stage and classification stage)
The teams were ranked according to points (3 points for a win, 1 point for a draw, 0 points for a loss). If tied on points, tiebreakers were applied in the following order:
 Greater number of points in matches between the tied teams;
 Greater goal difference in matches between the tied teams (if more than two teams finish equal on points);
 Greater number of goals scored in matches among the tied teams (if more than two teams finished equal on points);
 Greater goal difference in all group matches;
 Greater number of goals scored in all group matches;
 Drawing of lots.

All times are local, EST (UTC−5).

Group A

Group B

Group C

Classification stage
The top two teams from each group in the classification stage qualified for the 2017 FIFA U-17 World Cup, with the group winners also advancing to the final to decide the champions of the CONCACAF U-17 Championship.

Group D

Group E

Final
If the final was level at the end of 90 minutes, no extra time would be played and the match would be decided by a penalty shoot-out.

Awards

Winners

Individual awards
The following awards were given at the conclusion of the tournament.
Golden Ball
 Jairo Torres

Golden Boot
 Carlos Mejía (7 goals)

Golden Glove
 Justin Garces

Fair Play Award

Best XI
Goalkeeper:  Justin Garces
Right back:  Jaylin Lindsey
Center back:  James Sands
Center back:  Luis Olivas
Left back:  Walter Cortés
Right midfielder:  Jairo Torres
Central midfielder:  Chris Durkin
Central midfielder:  Alexis Gutiérrez
Left midfielder:  Carlos Mejía
Forward:  Daniel López
Forward:  Josh Sargent

Goalscorers
7 goals

 Carlos Mejía

6 goals

 Daniel López

5 goals

 Josh Sargent

4 goals

 Eduardo Guerrero
 Ayo Akinola

3 goals

 José Alfaro
 Brian Savigne
 Patrick Palacios 
 Roberto de la Rosa
 Luis Olivas
 Jairo Torres

2 goals

 Jonathan David
 Josué Abarca
 Luis Enrique Palma
 Ricardo McIntosh
 Ángel Orelien
 Andrew Carleton
 Zyen Jones
 Tim Weah

1 goal

 Alessandro Hojabrpour
 Antonio Rocco Romeo
 Karin Arce
 Julen Cordero
 Andrés Gómez
 Yecxy Jarquin
 Justin Montero
 Manuel Cruz
 Bruno Rendón
 Yandry Romero
 Nathan Bernadina
 Alexis Cerritos
 Obenson Leveille
 David Cardona
 Everson López
 Osbed Pérez
 Kaheem Parris
 Jeremy Verley
 Alan Maeda
 Carlos Robles
 Raúl Sandoval
 Adrián Vázquez
 Archero Hoever
 Chris Durkin
 Blaine Ferri
 Indiana Vassilev
 Bryan Reynolds

2 own goals

 Miguel Coll (playing against Costa Rica and United States)

1 own goal

 Giovanni Ávila (playing against Mexico)
 Kevin Menjívar (playing against Mexico)
 Jaylin Lindsey (playing against Mexico)
 Arturo Vasquez (playing against Cuba)

Qualified teams for FIFA U-17 World Cup
The following four teams from CONCACAF qualified for the 2017 FIFA U-17 World Cup.

1 Bold indicates champion for that year. Italic indicates host for that year.

References

External links
Under 17s – Men, CONCACAF.com

 
2017
U-17 Championship
International association football competitions hosted by Panama
2017 in youth association football
April 2017 sports events in North America
May 2017 sports events in North America